Bogdana may refer to the Bogdana Monastery, an Orthodox Christian monastery in Rădăuți, Suceava County, Romania.

Bogdana may also refer to several places in Romania:
 Bogdana, Teleorman, a commune in Teleorman County
 Bogdana, Vaslui, a commune in Vaslui County
 Bogdana, a village in Ștefan cel Mare Commune, Bacău County
 Bogdana, a village in Dragoș Vodă Commune, Călărași County
 Bogdana, a village in Buciumi Commune, Sălaj County
 Odaia-Bogdana, a village in Fălciu Commune, Vaslui County
 Bogdana-Voloseni, a village in Stănilești Commune, Vaslui County
 Bogdana (Simila), a tributary of the Simila in Vaslui County
 Bogdana, a tributary of the Suceava in Suceava County
 Bogdana, a tributary of the Trotuș in Bacău County